The Harlem International Film Festival (Hi) is an annual five-day film festival in Harlem, New York. The first festival took place in 2005. Michael Franti's I Know I'm Not Alone was named Best International Documentary at the festival that year. The short film Eme Nakia was selected to be screened at the 2006 festival. Also that year, The Hip Hop Project produced by Queen Latifah and Bruce Willis was named Best Documentary Film. Nigerian film Anchor Baby was named Best Film at the 2010 festival and won another award there as well. Omoni Oboli was named Best Actress that year. Najat Jellab's short film The Projectionist premiered at the 2013 festival. The festival named Vanessa L. Williams Best Actress one year. Short film In The Field, directed by Matthew Hope, was screened at the festival one year.:)

Harlem International Film Festival 2014 award winners

Harlem International Film Festival 2013 award winners

Harlem International Film Festival 2012 award winners

References

External links 

 Official Website

Film festivals in New York City
Festivals in Manhattan
Harlem
September events
Annual events in New York (state)
Film festivals established in 2005